In this name that follows Eastern Slavic naming conventions, the patronymic is Vladimirovich and the family name is Danilochkin. 

Sergey Vladimirovich Danilochkin  (Russian:Сергей Владимирович Данилочкин, born June 24, 1971)  – is Doctor of Economics, non-fiction writer, television personality, and Correspondent Member of the Russian Academy of Natural Sciences.

Life and Career   
Sergey Danilochkin was born in 1971, in Kazakhstan. In 1992, he graduated from St. Petersburg Military Institute of Railway Communications with specialty of military logistics. Sequentially in 1994, Danilochkin earned a master's degree in finance from the Moscow Aviation Institute with a specialty in economics and finance and further specialization in operations analysis and financial audit, based upon which he defended a doctoral dissertation in economics in 1996 and was admitted to the correspondent member of Russian Academy of Natural Sciences in 2000. 
 
From 1996 to 2009, he occupied numerous upper management positions at Ural Mining and Metallurgical Company and other companies, which led to the Gold Medal of Peter the Great awarded to him in 2004 for the contributions in the revival of post-Soviet science and economics in Russia. From 2009 to 2013, Danilochkin taught economics and finance subjects as a professor for the Department of Economics and Finance at the Institute of Humanities Odintsovo, while defending his doctoral thesis earned in 2010. 

Danolochkin is an author of over 50 serial publications in the field of microeconomics and enterprise management practices, with core competence in statistical analysis, business process systematization, project management, and general finance theory. Danilochkin's professional emphasis is on enterprise management profitability.

Prizes and Awards
 2000: Danilochkin elected as Member-Correspondent of Russian Academy of Natural Sciences.  
 2004: Danilochkin awarded the Golden Medal of Peter The Great for contributions in Economics in Russia. 
 2004: Danilochkin awarded the Honorary Diploma for the merits in the post-Soviet science and economics in Russia.

Peer Reviews

 
 http://famous-scientists.ru/list/3768
 http://socionet.ru/publication.xml?h=repec:rus:hseecb:83395&l=en
 http://yadi.sk/d/bT1nA1lNEc2u7
 http://yadi.sk/d/U7biyAy_Ec3hn
 http://yadi.sk/d/6udNCqs2Ec3jx
 http://yadi.sk/d/DJSKXz1XEc3mU

Panel Review Participation

Participation as an opponent to dissertation research at the Scientific Council – «Manufacturing Process and Internal Controls» on specific topics from the Moscow Aviation Institute.

Research Papers

- Study, JSC "RUSAL Global MENEDZHENT BV" Russia (Moscow) Aluminum Industry Sector, JSC "MOROTOSTROITEL", Samara, Russia 
 
- Dissertation, Russian Institute of Textile Industry, 2005, "Dividends as Enterprise Management Methodology" (Russian: "МЕТОДОЛОГИЯ ДИВИДЕНДНОГО УПРАВЛЕНИЯ ПРЕДПРИЯТИЕМ ПРОМЫШЛЕННОСТИ РОССИИ")  
http://economy-lib.com/metodologiya-dividendnogo-upravleniya-predpriyatiem-promyshlennosti-rossii

- Monography, Russian Humanitarian Scientific Fund, “Research and forecasting of results of activity of hi-tech industrial corporations as a primary factor of improvement of quality of growth of the domestic economy”.

Personal Life

Dr. Sergey Danilochkin resides in Sunny Isles Beach, Florida with his wife Victoria and three children.

Political Prosecution in Russia 

Being an open critic and oppositionist to Russian President Vladimir Putin from early 2000s, Danilochkin fled to the United States in 2010 by seeking political asylum after being persistently prosecuted in Russia for his political believes and facing a politically fabricated 10-year prison sentence. In Miami, he founded and successfully developed the Russian America TV channel with international reach of over 10 million viewers in 7 Russian speaking countries.

Danolochkin was at an epic of his academic and business carrier in Russia in late 2000s, when he came across the fraud scheme organized by highly appointed Russian law enforcement officials embezzling taxpayers' money from Russian government. Working as a team member auditing several Russian enterprises, Danilochkin challenged the suspects to clarify his audit findings, and was allegedly framed by them as a "fly-by-night king” who's been wizardry setting up shell companies. The organized-crime group behind the fabrication was the same organized-crime group that was involved in the famous Magnitsky affair, which centered on a similar style of tax fraud, according to Russian investigative journalists and Danilochkin himself, who says he was used as a pawn and fall guy.
 
Danilochkin has openly criticized Russian President Putin's military aggression onto Ukraine carried on in 2022. As a father of a drafting-age son and a former military officer, Danilochkin launched several antiwar broadcasts that featured strong favoritism for Ukraine and fact-based criticism of Russian military forcing young, untrained, and unwilling to fight recruits to face death from the Ukrainian armed forces.

Authorship

Articles

 - magazine VAK
Journal is included in the list of the leading peer-reviewed scientific journal and publications recommended WAC Ministry of Education and Science for publication of the main results of dissertation research. This journal must meet specific requirements: must be all-Russian and known to the scientific community and to publish at least once a 2 god, significant circulation and enter into the Russian catalog. Materials published in the journal are scientific expertise.

Other Scientific Journals and Textbooks

Activities in the United States

In 2011, Danilochkin started Russian America TV channel, which is located in Miami, Florida.

From 2010 and 2012, Danilochkin invested in over 50 residential properties in Homestead, Overtown, and Lauderhill, Florida.

In 2017, Danilochkin co-invested in the Le Jardin House project located in Bay Harbor, Florida, which he co-owns and co-manages as of October 2022. 

In 2019, Danilochkin joined Sergey Gurin in their start-up, Convertible Lease Properties, developing a non-FICO based alternative to the mortgage system in an attempt to resolve the housing affordability dilemma. Convertible Lease Properties LLC has its base operations in Richmond, Virginia and its head office in Miami Gardens, Florida.

References

  Danilochkin S.V.  Finance Director, Stupino Metallurgical Company Public Joint Stock Company
  Danilochkin S.V. Extended abstract of PhD dissertation (Economy). Russian Correspondence Institute of Textile and Light Industry, Moscow, 2010. (in Russian) 
  Danilochkin S.V. at the Network encyclopedia "Russian scientists "(in Russian)

Living people
1971 births
Corresponding Members of the Russian Academy of Sciences
Russian economists